An evidence board (also known as a "conspiracy board," "crazy wall," or "murder map") is a common background feature in thriller and detective fiction movies and TV. It features a collage of media from different sources, pinned to a pinboard or stuck to a wall, and frequently interconnected with string to mark connections. A more technical related name for these sorts of visualizations and charts within law enforcement are Anacapa charts which are used for social network analysis.

Evidence boards are associated in fiction with both detective activities and obsessional interests, including those of delusional individuals pursuing conspiracy theories, hence the alternative names.

Evidence boards can be seen in numerous TV series, including Homeland, Fargo, Sherlock, The Bridge and True Detective.

Evidence boards have also been used as a teaching tool.

References

Further consideration
Crazy Walls, a presentation in Tumblr

See also 
 Concept map
 Mind map
 Link analysis
 Network science

Conspiracy